Remzi Sedat İncesu (born 11 July 1972 Kayseri, Turkey) is a Turkish professional basketball coach. He is currently coaching the Turkish pro side Galatasaray Wheelchair Basketball Team.

Honours

Domestic competitions
 Turkish Wheelchair Basketball Super League:
 Winners (9): (record) 2006–07, 2007–08, 2008–09, 2009–10, 2010-11, 2011-12, 2012-13, 2013-14, 2014-15
 Turkish Wheelchair Basketball First League:
 Winners (1): 2005-06
 Sinan Erdem Wheelchair Basketball Cup:
 Winners (2): 2006, 2008
 Antalya Kepez Tournament:
 Winners (1): 2005

International competitions
 IWBF Champions Cup:
 Winners (5): 2008, 2009, 2011, 2013, 2014
 Finalist (1): 2012
 Kitakyushu Champions Cup:
 Winners (4): 2008, 2009, 2011, 2012
 André Vergauwen Cup:
 Semi-finalists(1): 2007
 Chieti Tournament:
 Winners (1): 2007
 South Eastern Europe (SEE) Championship Cup:
 Winners (1): 2006

External links
Profile at Galatasaray.org

Living people
1972 births
People from Kayseri
Turkish men's basketball players
Turkish basketball coaches
Wheelchair basketball coaches
Galatasaray S.K. (wheelchair basketball) coaches